The 1923 Texas Mines Miners football team was an American football team that represented the Texas School of Mines (now known as the University of Texas at El Paso) as an independent during the 1923 college football season.  In its second season under head coach Jack C. Vowell, the team compiled a 3–4 record and outscored opponents by a total of 115 to 65.

Schedule

References

Texas Mines
UTEP Miners football seasons
Texas Mines Miners football